Jackson's soft-furred mouse or Jackson's praomys (Praomys jacksoni) is a species of rodent in the family Muridae.
It is found in Angola, Burundi, Cameroon, Central African Republic, Republic of the Congo, Democratic Republic of the Congo, Equatorial Guinea, Gabon, Guinea, Kenya, Nigeria, Rwanda, South Sudan, Tanzania, Uganda, and Zambia.
Its natural habitats are subtropical or tropical moist lowland forest, subtropical or tropical moist montane forest, arable land, and heavily degraded former forest.

References

 Van der Straeten, E., Decher, J., Dieterlen, F., Kerbis Peterhans, J. & Agwanda, B. 2004.  Praomys jacksoni.   2006 IUCN Red List of Threatened Species.   Downloaded on 19 July 2007.

Praomys
Mammals described in 1897
Taxonomy articles created by Polbot